Hollow Way is a road in Oxford which leads from central Cowley to Wood Farm and Headington. It starts at the junction with Oxford Road and Garsington Road and finishes at The Slade and Horspath Driftway, running through neighbourhoods such as the Lye Valley. Its route number is B4495.

Streets in Oxford|Roads in the United Kingdom